Renato Feder (born 28 June 1978) is a Brazilian economist, entrepreneur, politician and professor. He has been serving as the State Secretary of Education of Paraná since January 2019. Feder is also a partner at the Brazilian electronics and computing company, Multilaser.

Biography
Feder was born in the city of São Paulo in 1978. He graduated in Administration at Getúlio Vargas Foundation, and received a Master in Economics at University of São Paulo (USP).

Career
At Multilaser, Brazilian S.A. company in the branch of electronics and computing, founded in 1987, which he leads alongside Alexandre Ostrowiecki, he acts in import and commercialization of products from sectors of technology, multimedia accessories and toys.

He assumed an office in the State Secretariat of Education of Paraná in 2019, nominated by Governor Ratinho Júnior.

In June 2020, Feder was considered to succeed Abraham Weintraub in the Ministry of Education.

On 3 July 2020, it was announced that Feder was chosen by President Jair Bolsonaro as the next Minister of Education, where he would succeed Carlos Decotelli, who was nominated but didn't take office. Two days later, he declined the invitation.

References

|-

1978 births
Living people
Brazilian Jews
Brazilian businesspeople
Fundação Getulio Vargas alumni
University of São Paulo alumni
New Party (Brazil) politicians